The Group IV tournament was held in the Week commencing April 7, in Escazú, Costa Rica, on outdoor hard courts.

Round robin

Results of Individual Ties

Guatemala and St.Lucia promoted to Group III for 2005.

References

2004 Davis Cup Americas Zone
Davis Cup Americas Zone